Mezzo is a French television channel devoted to classical music (including opera and ballet), jazz and world music. It was formed in 1992 and was called France Supervision until 1998. In 2010 it added a sister channel, Mezzo Live HD.

In January 2008 it introduced a new filler feature, Divertimezzo, renamed Intermezzo in 2011, consisting of video clips fashioned from its programmes, with the usual wide range of music.

In the Scandinavian region the channel is distributed by Scandinavian television broadcaster NonStop Television, part of Turner Broadcasting. In Portugal it is available in basic cable, RF output in FTTH services and as a digital channel across platforms.

References

External links
 
Mezzo TV at LyngSat Address

Canal+
Television stations in France
Television channels in the Netherlands
French-language television stations
Classical music television channels
Television stations in Denmark
Music organizations based in France
Television channels and stations established in 1998
1998 establishments in France